Liberata Mulamula, née Rutageruka (born 1956) is a Tanzanian diplomat and politician who served as Minister for Foreign Affairs and East African Cooperation from April 2021 to October 2022. She was appointed by President Samia Suluhu, on 31 March 2021 and was sworn into office on 1 April 2021.

Ambassador Mulamula has a 35+ year history as a diplomat and administrator in the Tanzanian Ministry of Foreign Affairs and Regional Cooperation, including as Tanzania's ambassador to the United Nations in New York City, Canada and the United States of America.

Before her retirement from the diplomatic service in April 2016, she served as the Permanent Secretary at the Ministry Foreign Affairs and East African Cooperation, for a period of seven months, between May 2015 until December 2015.

She also served as the first Executive Secretary of the International Conference on the Great Lakes Region (ICGLR), based in Bujumbura, Burundi, from 2006 until 2011. In this role, she oversaw Peace, Stability and Development in 11 countries in the African Great Lakes Region.

Background and education
Liberata Rutageruka was born in April 1956 in Misenyi,Kitobo Musibuka, Bukoba District, in Kagera Region. She has a twin sister by the name Iluminata Maerere who also served as UNDP seara Lione . She attended primary school locally, starting at the age of six years. She completed her O-Level education at Tabora Girls School in 1973. She went on to graduate with the equivalent of a high school diploma from 
Mzizima Secondary School in 1975, after completing her A-Level studies.

From 1977 until 1980, Liberata studied at the University of Dar es Salaam, graduating with a Bachelor of Arts degree, majoring in Political Science and International Relations. Later, she earned a Master of Arts degree in Government and Politics, from St. John's University in New York City, in 1989. Still later, St. John's University awarded her a Postgraduate Diploma in International Law.

Politics 
While Liberata is a career diplomat, she did not enter into politics until her appointment by President Jakaya Kikwete,  as the Permanent Secretary at the Ministry of Foreign Affairs in 2015. Following the sudden death of president John Magufuli, she was appointed as the new Minister of Foreign affairs on 31 March 2021 in the 6th Cabinet of Tanzania. Mulamula was simultaneously, concurrently nominated to the Parliament of Tanzania (2020-2025).

Personal life
Liberata Rutageruka was born on 10 April 1956 in Muleba, Bukoba, Kagera Region. She is the mother of two children.

References

External links
 Brief Profile As of 31 March 2021.
 Take Five with Ambassador Liberata Mulamula: Placing women at the front and center of Africa’s peace and security agenda (Interview) As of 3 August 2020.

1956 births
Living people
Ambassadors of Tanzania to the United States
Chama Cha Mapinduzi MPs
Chama Cha Mapinduzi politicians
Female foreign ministers
Foreign ministers of Tanzania
Government ministers of Tanzania
High Commissioners of Tanzania to Canada
Nominated Tanzanian MPs
People from Bukoba
People from Kagera Region
St. John's University (New York City) alumni
Tanzanian women ambassadors
Tanzanian women diplomats
University of Dar es Salaam alumni
Women government ministers of Tanzania